János György Szilágyi (16 July 1918 – 7 January 2016) was a Hungarian historian who was a specialist in ancient drama and Greek art. He was born in Budapest. In 2011 he was awarded the Order of Merit of the Republic of Hungary. He died at the age of 97 in 2016.

Selected publications
Ancient art. Budapest Museum of Fine Arts, Budapest, 2003. 
In search of Pelasgian ancestors: The 1861 Hungarian excavations in the Apennines. Atlantisz, Budapest, 2004.

References

20th-century Hungarian historians
1918 births
Writers from Budapest
2016 deaths
Hungarian classical scholars